Eric Joseph Jungmann (born December 2, 1981) is an American film and television actor perhaps best known for his role as "the obsessed best friend," Ricky Lipman in Not Another Teen Movie. He is also known for his role of Jain McManus in Night Stalker and had a recurring role of Ivan, Larry Beale's yes-man in the Disney Channel original sitcom Even Stevens.

Early life 
Jungmann was born in Orlando, Florida, the son of restaurateurs Janet and Jim Jungmann. He attended both the North East School of the Arts and the International School of the Americas, both in San Antonio, Texas.

Career 
Jungmann grew up studying acting and filmmaking in Texas beginning his career with small roles in local films like Varsity Blues and The Faculty. He later moved to Los Angeles where he's continually evolving as an artist working in TV and films like Not Another Teen Movie and Winning London. He's collaborated as an actor on shows like Criminal Minds, True Blood, Veronica Mars, Even Stevens and Night Stalker as well as multiple feature films premiering at film festivals such as Sundance, Tribeca, SXSW and Sitges.

Jungmann has also appeared in countless TV commercials for worldwide brands including, Apple, Nintendo, Subaru, Wendy’s, Burger King and Canon.

Filmography

Film

Television

References

External links

1981 births
American male film actors
American male television actors
Male actors from Florida
Living people